Conus gondwanensis is a species of sea snail, a marine gastropod mollusk in the family Conidae, the cone snails and their allies.

Like all species within the genus Conus, these snails are predatory and venomous. They are capable of "stinging" humans, therefore live ones should be handled carefully or not at all.

Description
The size of the shell attains 20 mm.

Distribution
This marine species occurs off New Caledonia.

References

 Röckel D., Richard G. & Moolenbeek R.G. (1995) Deep-water cones (Gastropoda: Conidae) from the New Caledonian region. In Bouchet P. (ed.). Résultats des Campagnes Musorstom 14. Mémoires du Muséum National d'Histoire Naturelle 167: 557–594.
 Monnier E., Limpalaër L., Robin A. & Roux C. (2018). A taxonomic iconography of living Conidae. Harxheim: ConchBooks. 2 vols. 1205 pp.
page(s): 345 
 Puillandre N., Duda T.F., Meyer C., Olivera B.M. & Bouchet P. (2015). One, four or 100 genera? A new classification of the cone snails. Journal of Molluscan Studies. 81: 1–23

External links
 
 Holotype at MNHN, Paris

gondwanensis
Gastropods described in 1995